Jobos is a barrio in the municipality of Isabela, Puerto Rico. Its population in 2010 was 3,446.

History
Puerto Rico was ceded by Spain in the aftermath of the Spanish–American War under the terms of the Treaty of Paris of 1898 and became an unincorporated territory of the United States. In 1899, the United States Department of War conducted a census of Puerto Rico finding that the population of Jobos barrio was 1,551.

Places in Jobos
In 2019, the headquarters for Solar Libre, a new school where students can study solar energy, was established in Jobos. It was established with financial support from Samsung, The Hispanic Federation and NFL football player, Victor Cruz.

Jobos Beach, known as a world-class surf spot and where in February 2013, the Rip Curl Pro surfing competition was held, is located in Jobos barrio.

There is a cemetery in Jobos.

Gallery

See also

 List of communities in Puerto Rico

References

Barrios of Isabela, Puerto Rico